Dubbing Brothers is a French dubbing studio based in La Plaine Saint-Denis, France with four facilities in Italy, the United States, Belgium, and Germany with a partnership in Spain. The company was founded in 1989. Philippe Taïeb is president of the company.

Clients
 Warner Bros.
 Cartoon Network
 Viacom
 Paramount Pictures
 Nickelodeon
 JibJab
 Universal Studios
 Dreamworks Animation
 Disney

Filmography
 Camp Lazlo
 Phineas and Ferb
 Cowboy Bebop: The Movie
 Pokémon: The Movie 2000
 Porco Rosso
 Cougar Town
 Tekkon Kinkreet
 Transporter 3
 Resident Evil: Degeneration
 The Crimson Rivers
 Final Flight of the Osiris
 LazyTown
 Kingsman: The Secret Service
 Kingsman: The Golden Circle
 Evangelion: 1.0 You Are (Not) Alone
 Evangelion: 2.0 You Can (Not) Advance
 Evangelion: 3.0 You Can (Not) Redo

References

External links
 Official Site

French dubbing studios
Mass media companies established in 1989
Entertainment companies of France
1989 establishments in France
Mass media in Paris